Naus may refer to:

Carracks (or naus), early modern Portuguese ships
 John E. Naus, American priest
 Josef Naus, German surveyor and mountain climber

See also 
 
 Naos (disambiguation)
 Nau (disambiguation)